Bdallophytum is a genus of parasitic flowering plants with five described species. It parasitizes on the roots of plants of the genus Bursera, such as Bursera simaruba. The genus is endemic to the Neotropics.

It was previously placed in Rafflesiaceae, but is now placed in family Cytinaceae, together with the only other genus Cytinus. Some Bdallophytum species were at one time considered to belong to this latter genus.

Bdallophytum is dioecious.

Name
The genus name is probably derived from Ancient Greek bdell- "leech" and phyton "plant". It was later misspelled as Bdallophyton by Eichler, and this synonym is now also in common use.

Species
 Bdallophytum americanum
 Bdallophytum andrieuxii
 Bdallophytum bambusarum
 Bdallophytum ceratantherum
 Bdallophytum oxylepis

Footnotes

References
  (2004): Phylogenetic inference in Rafflesiales: the influence of rate heterogeneity and horizontal gene transfer. BMC Evolutionary Biology 4: 40.

Further reading
  (2006): The holoparasitic endophyte Bdallophyton americanum affects root water conductivity of the tree Bursera simaruba. Trees - Structure and Function 21(2): 215–220.

External links
 Cytinaceae References
Parasitic Plant Connection: Cytinaceae

Malvales genera
Cytinaceae
Parasitic plants
Dioecious plants
Taxa named by August W. Eichler